Holy Trinity Catholic Schools is a PK-12 Roman Catholic school headquartered in Fort Madison, Iowa, with campuses in Fort Madison and West Point. Fort Madison has the secondary school campus and one early childhood campus, while West Point has the elementary school and an early childhood center on another campus. The school system is located in the Roman Catholic Diocese of Davenport.

History

Holy Trinity Catholic School was created in July 2005 with the merging of the Marquette Catholic School System from the West Point Area and the Aquinas Catholic Schools from the Fort Madison Area. The Marquette building was chosen for junior high school while the Aquinas building was chosen for senior high school. At the time 131 students were at the secondary level in Aquinas. The merger was due to increasing costs and the declining population of Lee County, the latter of which meant reduced numbers of pupils. The school received a different set of school colors and mascot, and the school administration allowed parents and students to have a say.

In 2006 Cardinal Stritch High School of Keokuk merged into Holy Trinity High School.

Principal Doris Turner, the first principal since the consolidation, retired in 2011.

In 2017 the school scheduled a renovation of the high school area, refurbishing the electrical systems and installing solar panels.

A new elementary school building in West Point was completed in 2019.

Previously a preschool was in St. Paul.

Athletics
The Crusaders compete in the Southeast Iowa Superconference in the following sports:
Cross Country
Volleyball
 2014 Class 1A State Champions
Basketball
Track and Field
Golf
Soccer
Tennis
Baseball
Softball

Holy Trinity students can also compete in wrestling with Fort Madison, and bowling with Keokuk.

External links
 School Website

Notes and references

Catholic secondary schools in Iowa
Catholic high schools in the United States
Catholic middle schools in the United States
Catholic elementary schools in the United States
Roman Catholic Diocese of Davenport
Schools in Lee County, Iowa
2005 establishments in Iowa
Educational institutions established in 2005
Private middle schools in Iowa
Private elementary schools in Iowa
Private K-12 schools in the United States
Fort Madison, Iowa